"I Belong to You" is a 1991 song by Nikki Sudden from the album The Jewel Thief. The songs were recorded during a brief period when Sudden guested at R.E.M. guitarist Peter Buck's home in Athens, Georgia. According to Nikki Sudden, the inspiration for the song came from Roger McGuinn's "King of the Hill" song. The song was later collected on the 2000 compilation The Last Bandit: The Best of Nikki Sudden.

Track listing
All songs written by Nikki Sudden:
"I Belong to You" – 3:27
"Alley of the Street" – 1:49
"Jigsaw Blues" – 2:56

Personnel
Bill Berry – drums
Peter Buck – electric & acoustic guitars
Brian Burke – harmonica
John Keane – bass guitar, pedal steel guitar, audio mixing
Mike Mills – Hammond organ
Nikki Sudden – vocals

External links

1991 singles
Folk rock songs
R.E.M.
Song recordings produced by Peter Buck
1991 songs